Yáser Esneider Asprilla Martínez (born 19 November 2003) is a Colombian professional footballer who plays as a midfielder for Championship side Watford and the Colombia national team.

Club career
Yaser Asprilla is a product of Envigado youth academy. He made his professional debut with Envigado in a 0–3 Categoría Primera A loss to Independiente Medellín on 2 December 2020. On 18 July 2021 he scored his first professional goal for Envigado in a 2–2 draw with Atlético Nacional.

With a deal agreed in August 2021, Envigado confirmed the transfer of Asprilla to Watford on 17 January 2022.

International career
Asprilla made his debut for the Colombia national team on 16 January 2022 as a 43rd minute substitute for Juan Fernando Quintero, in a 2–1 home win over Honduras. On his second international appearance, Asprilla netted his first goal for Colombia in a 4–1 friendly win over Guatemala.

Career statistics

Club

International

Scores and results list Colombia's goal tally first, score column indicates score after each Asprilla goal.

References

External links
 

2003 births
Living people
Colombian footballers
Colombia international footballers
Association football midfielders
Categoría Primera A players
Envigado F.C. players
Sportspeople from Chocó Department